Max Pons (24 February 1927 – 10 April 2021) was a French poet and editor. He was Editor-in-Chief of the newspaper La Barbacane.

Awards
Grand prix de poésie de la SGDL for Vers le Silence (2011)

Works
Bonaguil, château de rêves (1959)
Évocation du vieux Fumel (1959)
Calcaire (1970)
Écriture des pierres, étude sur des graffitis XVIe et XVIIe siècles (1971)
Voyage en chair, Regards sur Bonaguil (1975)
Formes et paroles (1978)
Écritures des Pierres (1979)
Nouveaux regards sur Bonaguil (1979)
Vie et légende d'un grand château fort (1987)
Le Château des mots (1988)
Autour de Jean Follain et de quelques autres (1991)
À propos de Douarnenez (1999)
Poésie de Bretagne, aujourd'hui (2002)
Les Armures du silence (2002)
Une Bastide en Quercy : Montcabrier (2009)
Vers le Silence, itinéraire poétique (2011)

References

1927 births
2021 deaths
French poets
French newspaper editors
People from Lot-et-Garonne